TuralTuranX is an Azerbaijani musical duo consisting of twin brothers Tural and Turan Bağmanov (born 30 October 2000).  They are set to represent Azerbaijan in the Eurovision Song Contest 2023 with their song "Tell Me More".

History
Tural and Turan Bağmanov are from Zaqatala in northwestern Azerbaijan. They first saw a piano at school and were so fascinated by it that they often secretly practiced songs. Then their father bought them a used synthesizer. Later they also learned to play the guitar. TuralTuranX first appeared in schools and at some events. However, after the death of their father, they temporarily stopped making music.

Tural later moved to the capital Baku and founded the band TheRedJungle with a friend, with whom Turan also performed. The brothers also performed as street musicians.

On 2 February 2023, it was announced that TuralTuranX are among the last five candidates of Azerbaijan's internal selection for the Eurovision Song Contest 2023. On 9 March, they were selected as the Azerbaijani representatives for the Eurovision Song Contest. They are scheduled to compete in the first semi-final on 9 May with their song "Tell Me More".

Personal lives
Tural and Turan Bağmanov had two other brothers named Emin and Camal, both of whom died in a road accident in Yuxarı Tala in 2015.

Discography
Singles
"Tell Me More" (2023)

References 

2000 births
Living people
People from Zaqatala District
Azerbaijani pop music groups
Eurovision Song Contest entrants for Azerbaijan
Eurovision Song Contest entrants of 2023
Twin musical duos
Identical twin males